If Not Us, Who? is a 2011 German drama film directed by Andres Veiel and starring August Diehl. The film is set in the late 1940s, the early 1960s, and at the beginning of the Protests of 1968.

The film premiered In Competition at the 61st Berlin International Film Festival and was nominated for the Golden Bear. Veiel won the Alfred Bauer Prize at the Berlinale. The film had its US premiere at the Berlin and Beyond film festival in San Francisco on 26 October 2011.

Cast 
 August Diehl as Bernward Vesper
 Lena Lauzemis as Gudrun Ensslin
 Alexander Fehling as Andreas Baader
 Alexander Khuon as Rudi Dutschke
 Rainer Bock as Defense lawyer
 Sebastian Blomberg as Roehler
 Maria-Victoria Dragus as Ruth Ensslin
 Thomas Thieme as Vater Vesper
 Joachim Paul Assböck as Journalist
 Hanno Koffler as Uli Ensslin
 Heike Hanold-Lynch as Mentorin v. G. Ensslin
 Hark Bohm as Kritiker
 Imogen Kogge as Mutter Vesper
 Henriette Nagel
 Susanne Lothar as Mutter Ensslin

References

External links 
 

2011 films
German drama films
2010s German-language films
Films directed by Andres Veiel
Cultural depictions of the Red Army Faction
Films set in Berlin
Films set in West Germany
2011 drama films
2010s German films